Crambus heringiellus is a species of moth in the family Crambidae described by Gottlieb August Wilhelm Herrich-Schäffer in 1848. It is found in  Italy, Germany, Poland, Denmark, Fennoscandia, the Baltic region, Belarus and Russia.

The wingspan is 19–24 mm.

The larvae feed on Hypnum species.

References

External links
Lepiforum.de

Moths described in 1848
Crambini
Moths of Europe
Taxa named by Gottlieb August Wilhelm Herrich-Schäffer